Nicholson is a meteorite crater in the Northwest Territories, Canada.

The crater is not exposed at the surface.

References

External links
Aerial Exploration of the Nicholson impact structure

Devonian impact craters
Impact craters of the Northwest Territories